The Flow Country is a large, rolling expanse of peatland and wetland area of Caithness and Sutherland in the North of Scotland. It is an area of deep peat, dotted with bog pools and a very important habitat for wildlife, as well as climate change mitigation. As peat is largely made up of the remains of plants, which are themselves made up of carbon, it locks up large stores of carbon for thousands of years. This carbon would otherwise be released to the atmosphere and contribute to global warming. The Flow Country is currently being considered as a potential World Heritage Site on account of its unparalleled blanket bog habitat. It could be part of the Global Peatlands Initiative.

Wildlife 

Named after the Old Norse word 'floi' meaning 'wet' or 'marshy', the Flow Country is home to a rich variety of wildlife, and is used as a breeding ground for many different species of birds, including greenshank, dunlin, merlin and golden plover. Birds of prey found in the Flow Country include the buzzard and hen harrier.

One of the most prevalent plant species of the Flow Country is sphagnum moss, which can store large amounts of water, and eventually form peat – the building block of a blanket bog. Carnivorous plants such as roundleaved sundew, greater sundew, and butterwort feed on the multitude of insects that inhabit the Flow Country.

Large mammals such as red deer, and the less common, roe deer roam the Flow Country all year round and can be heard roaring during the autumn rutting season.

History 

The Flow Country was altered between 1979 and 1987 through the planting of conifer forests and the cutting of drains. Tree restoration on private land was supported by subsidies and tax relief schemes at a time of high personal taxation.

The ploughing of the bogs and tree planting helped to reduce local unemployment which was among the highest in the United Kingdom: however in 1987 the Nature Conservancy Council (NCC) launched a report in London that was highly critical of the foresters.  The Conservative Party which was in government at the time decided to disband the NCC and create a separate Scottish agency now called Scottish Natural Heritage. However, in 1988 Nigel Lawson, The Chancellor of the Exchequer, recognised that a tax break was doing enormous harm to the last real wilderness in the United Kingdom and scrapped the forestry tax reliefs. This immediately halted further planting and encouraged the Forestry Commission to adopt a much broader approach that respects existing landscapes.

Ongoing conservation 

In an effort to restore the damage, the Royal Society for the Protection of Birds (RSPB) have bought a large area in the centre of the Flow Country and have created the Forsinard Flows national nature reserve. More than 20 km2 has been bought back from Fountain Forestry and the young trees felled and allowed to rot in the plough furrow in the hope and expectation that, in 30 to 100 years, the land will revert to peat bog.

The RSPB was also a leading partner in the Flows to the Future Project, an ambitious, far-reaching project which aimed to restore vast areas of the Flow Country and increase public and visitor awareness of the importance of the Flow Country. The project funded the iconic, award-winning Flows Lookout Tower.

Around 1500 km2 of the Flow Country is protected as both a Special Protection Area and Special Area of Conservation under the name Caithness and Sutherland Peatlands.

The Flow Country is on the 2006 UK "tentative list" as a possible UNESCO World Heritage Site. The application was re-listed in 2010 and Stuart Housden, the director of RSPB Scotland and a member of the Rural Development Council, said, "This largely unspoilt landscape has thousands of hectares of ancient blanket peat land, making this perhaps the most important area of its type in the Northern Hemisphere. A global badge would certainly help us to get this special place in better heart. This area was sorely threatened in the 1980s and early 1990s by inappropriate afforestation, but just in time a conservation campaign mounted by the RSPB stopped the worst excesses. Action is now underway to restore the area."

Rail access
The Far North Line connects into Forsinard station serving the area.

References

External links
The Flow Country website
RSPB Forsinard Flows Reserve
RSPB Flow Country Appeal
Peat bogs on SNH

Wetlands of Scotland
Caithness
Landforms of Sutherland
Rural Scotland
Protected areas of Highland (council area)
Landforms of Highland (council area)